A Woman is a 2010 American-Italian drama film written and directed by Giada Colagrande and starring Willem Dafoe and Jess Weixler.

Plot

Cast
Willem Dafoe as Max Oliver
Jess Weixler as Julie
Stefania Rocca as Natalie
Michele Venitucci as Vincenzo
Mariela Franganillo as Lucia Giordano

References

External links
 
 

2010s English-language films
2010s Italian-language films
2010 films
American drama films
Italian drama films
English-language Italian films
Films scored by Angelo Badalamenti
2010 drama films
2010s American films